This is a list of the Opiliones or harvestmen of Trinidad and Tobago. Representatives of ten families are currently known to live on Trinidad, the information on Tobago is still sparse.
Goodnight and Goodnight produced one of the first listings of Trinidad opiliones in 1947 in a paper in which they named several new species. In Kury's 2003 catalogue of New World opiliones Trinidad was covered as well. The most recent work was done by Townsend, Proud and Moore in 2008 and included several new species that are still awaiting identification.

Agoristenidae
 Trinella albiornata (Goodnight and Goodnight, 1947)
 Trinella intermedia (Goodnight and Goodnight, 1947)
 Trinella leiobuniformis (Šilhavý, 1973)

Cosmetidae
 Cynortula granulata Roewer, 1912
 Cynortula modesta (Sørenson, 1932)
 Cynortula undulata Roewer, 1947
 Libitiosoma granulatum Roewer, 1947
 Paecilaema adspersum Roewer, 1947
 Paecilaema inglei Goodnight and Goodnight, 1947
 Paecilaema paucipustulatum Roewer, 1947
 Vonones testaceus Roewer, 1947

Cranaidae
 Phareicranaus calcariferus (Simon, 1879) (Santinezia serratotibialis Roewer, 1932 was previously listed as a separate species but is now assumed to be a synonym of P. calcariferus.)

Manaosbiidae
 Cranellus montgomeryi Goodnight and Goodnight, 1947
 Rhopalocranaus albilineatus Roewer, 1932

Samoidae
 Maracaynatum trinidadense Šilhavý, 1979
 Pellobunus longipalpus Goodnight and Goodnight, 1947

Sclerosomatidae
 Holcobunus aureopunctata 
 Prionostemma fulginosum 
 Prionostemma insulare 
 Prionostemma referens 
 Prionostemma vittatum Roewer, 1910

Stygnidae
 Stygnoplus clavotibialis (Goodnight and Goodnight, 1947)

Zalmoxidae 
 Ethobunus tuberculatus (Goodnight and Goodnight, 1947)

Kimulidae
 Unidentified species

Stygnommatidae
 Stygnomma sp.

References

See also
Natural history of Trinidad and Tobago

 Opiliones
Opiliones
Harvestmen
Trinidad